The Concord Square Historic District is a historic district on Park, Concord, and Kendall Streets, and Union Avenue in Framingham, Massachusetts.  It encompasses a portion of the town's central business district, extending from the junction of Concord and Union Streets south to the South Framingham Common, and then west along Park Street.  Most of the buildings in this area were built between 1890 and 1920.  The oldest building is the Wallace Nutting Factory at 46 Park Street, built in the early 1870s.  The district was added to the National Register of Historic Places in 1983.

See also
Irving Square Historic District, just to the south
National Register of Historic Places listings in Framingham, Massachusetts

References

Historic districts in Framingham, Massachusetts
National Register of Historic Places in Middlesex County, Massachusetts
Historic districts on the National Register of Historic Places in Massachusetts